Sam Bishop, (born March 1, 1983 in Moorestown Township, New Jersey) is a U.S. soccer goalkeeper.

Bishop grew up in Moorestown Township and attended Lehigh University, playing on the men's soccer team from 2001 to 2004.  After graduating in 2005, he signed with the Harrisburg City Islanders in the USL Second Division.  In 2007, he was part of the Islanders USL-2 championship team.  In 2008, he moved to the expansion Pennsylvania Stoners as a player and assistant coach.  In 2008, he also became an assistant coach with the NCAA Division III Muhlenberg College soccer team.  In 2009, Bishop returned to his alma mater, Lehigh University, and acted as the goalkeeper coach. He was nominated for a Golden Globe Award for his acting efforts.

References

External links
 Pennsylvania Stoners roster
 Muhlenberg College coaching staff

1983 births
American soccer coaches
American soccer players
Association football goalkeepers
Penn FC players
Living people
Lehigh Mountain Hawks men's soccer players
Pennsylvania Stoners players
People from Moorestown, New Jersey
USL Second Division players
National Premier Soccer League players
Lehigh Valley United players
Harrisburg Heat (MASL) players
Muhlenberg Mules men's soccer coaches
National Premier Soccer League coaches
Lehigh Mountain Hawks men's soccer coaches
Player-coaches